Abildgaardia ovata is a perennial herb of the genus Abildgaardia and the family Cyperaceae. It is a widespread species that can be found in West, Southern and East Afria, Florida, Mexico, the Caribbean and in some countries of Latin America.

Other names for the herb include Fimbristylis ovata and Abildgaardia monostachya.

Description
A short rhizome with hardened and leafy bas, It grows in wooded and wet grasslands and as a weed in Asia and in Florida.

References

Cyperaceae
Flora of Zimbabwe
Flora of Florida
Taxa named by Nicolaas Laurens Burman